Velda Newman is a contemporary American quilter from Northern California, specializing in close-up depictions of the natural world. Common subjects for her quilts are flowers, fruit, and fish.

Newman has received numerous national and international quilting awards, including her quilt "Hydrangea" being listed as one of "The 20th Century's 100 Best Quilts".

References

Further reading

External links
 
 http://www.artofthequilt.com/newman.html

21st-century American women
Quilters
American women artists
American artists
Living people
Year of birth missing (living people)